The 7th Golden Melody Awards ceremony was held at the Sun Yat-sen Memorial Hall in Taipei on June 8, 1996.

References

External links
  7th Golden Melody Awards nominees 
  7th Golden Melody Awards winners 

Golden Melody Awards
Golden Melody Awards
Golden Melody Awards
Golden Melody Awards